The Boeing Model 203 was a three-seat biplane trainer build by Boeing in the late 1920s and used in the company training school.

Development and design
The 203 was a low-power biplane designed to compete with other standard training aircraft. Its front cockpit accommodated 2 passengers side-by-side, or 1 student with a second set of controls. Its fuselage was welded steel tubing (the last Boeing aircraft to be built this way) and its wings were made of solid wood spars and plywood ribs. Physically it resembled a combination of the Boeing Model 95 and Boeing P-12.

Initially five 203s were built. The first had a 145 hp engine, and first flew on 1 July 1929. The second aircraft was fitted with a 165 hp 5-cylinder Wright J-6-5 engine. It first flew on 29 August 1929 and was designated Model 203A. The final three aircraft had the original Axelson engine, upgraded to 165 hp. All aircraft were delivered to the Boeing School of Aeronautics in Oakland, California, and all were eventually converted into 203As.

After years of service, the vertical tails of the 203As were redesigned to align with those on the Boeing Model 218. Two more aircraft were built at the Boeing School, one in 1935 and one in 1936.

By 1941 the two new 203s and an original aircraft were converted to 203Bs. A larger 220 hp 9-cylinder Lycoming R-680 radial engine was installed, and more advanced training equipment was fitted for use by more advanced students.

When the Boeing School was closed due to the Second World War, the four 203As were transferred to United Air Lines at Cheyenne, Wyoming, two 203Bs were sold to a private owner, and the fate of the final 203B is unknown.

Variants
203prototype powered by a  Axelson A radial engine and four production aircraft powered by  Axelson B radial engines; 4 built.
203A  The second 203 produced with a  Wright J-6-5 engine and the three 203s converted, by replacing their Axelson engines. Also, two additional aircraft built in 1935 and 1936 :3 built + 3 converted.
203BThree 203As converted to 203Bs by installation of  Lycoming R-680 radial engines.

Operators

 Boeing School of Aeronautics
 United Air Lines

Specifications (203)

References

1920s United States military trainer aircraft
203
Single-engined tractor aircraft
Biplanes
Aircraft first flown in 1929